The Esquias Formation is a geologic formation in Honduras. It preserves fossils dating back to the Cretaceous period.

Fossil content 
 Iguanodontidae indet.

See also 
 List of fossiliferous stratigraphic units in Honduras

References

Further reading 
 G. S. Horne, M. G. Atwood, and A. P. King. 1974. Stratigraphy, sedimentology, and paleoenvironment of Esquias Formation of Honduras. The American Association of Petroleum Geologists Bulletin 58(2):176-188

Geologic formations of Honduras
Cretaceous Honduras
Shale formations
Sandstone formations
Fluvial deposits
Lacustrine deposits
Formations